The Yasachnaya (Cahaak) is a river in the Russian Far East. It rises in the Chersky Range and meets the Kolyma near the settlement of Zyryanka. Its main tributaries are Omulyovka, Olguya, Rassokha and Gonyucha, all from the left.

See also
List of rivers of Russia

References

External links
Nature.ykt
Photo of the Yasachnaya River

Rivers of the Sakha Republic